Arnan is a village in Chahardangeh-ye Jonubi Rural District of Chahardangeh District, Hurand County, East Azerbaijan province, Iran. At the 2006 National Census, its population was 774 in 169 households, when it was in the former Hurand District of Ahar County. The following census in 2011 counted 693 people in 180 households. The latest census in 2016 showed a population of 687 people in 200 households; it was the largest village in the former Chahardangeh Rural District.

References 

Populated places in East Azerbaijan Province